Stephen Norwood  Smith (November 24, 1951 – September 23, 2020) was an American Olympic pole vaulter. He was the first person to clear the 18 foot barrier indoors.  He was the number one ranked pole vaulter in the world in 1973.

Athletic career

Smith was United States indoor pole vault champion in 1972–73. He was also the first vaulter to break the 18-foot barrier indoors in 1973.

Smith qualified for the 1972 Munich Olympics but failed to make the final.
In the Olympic trials, Smith finished second in a top-quality competition – Bob Seagren, the winner, broke the world record. At the Olympics, Smith was one of the athletes affected by a ban by the world governing body the IAAF on the lighter poles they had been using all season. An initial ban in July had been reversed on August 27, but on the eve of the competition, August 30, the IAAF reimposed their ban claiming the poles were new equipment and therefore invalid. Smith finished 18th in qualifying and was so upset he threw his pole away in disgust at the end of the competition.

Following his Olympic disaster, Smith rededicated himself to pole vaulting.

He had a long-standing sporting rivalry with his fellow American pole vaulter Bob Seagren that famously developed into a personal and very public animosity.

This rivalry was used as a promotional item for the new professional track and field tour of the International Track Association (ITA) that Smith and Seagren both joined – Seagren from the start of the ITA in 1973, Smith for the 1974 season. After the ITA folded in 1976, Smith applied to regain his amateur status having it restored eventually in 1979. He pursued legal action to enable him to take part in the Olympic Trials for the 1980 Moscow Olympics from which he was initially banned. Smith finished fourth at the trials making him the alternate if one of top three finishers could not compete. However, this status was made meaningless with the United States boycott of the Moscow Olympics.

Smith retired from athletics in 1983 after suffering an ankle injury in a car accident.

Smith, a natural showman, was always popular with the crowds, for his muscular physique, love of surfing and his eye-catching dress sense – he famously competed in cranberry-colored, psychedelic ski pants.

Early life

Smith attended South Torrance High School.  He was the CIF California State Meet champion in the event in 1968, defeating the namesake son of double Olympic pole vault champion Bob Richards on fewer misses.

His first college was the University of Southern California. He started the year his nemesis, Bob Seagren, graduated. After one year he left for Long Beach State. At Long Beach State he was refused permission to work with his coach, Dick Tomlinson, who was not on the college staff, so he ended up training with the Pacific Coast Club instead.

Later life

Smith became a real-estate agent in southern California after retiring.

World rankings

Smith was voted by the experts at Track and Field News to be ranked among the best in the USA and the world at the pole vault during his career. He was ranked during his early career and again when he returned to amateur competition. He would also have ranked during his professional career in the intervening years if the rankings had allowed this.

Accolades 

In 2012, Smith was inducted into the United States National Pole Vault Hall of Fame.

See also 
Men's pole vault indoor world record progression

References 

1951 births
2020 deaths
American male pole vaulters
Athletes (track and field) at the 1972 Summer Olympics
Olympic track and field athletes of the United States
World record setters in athletics (track and field)
Track and field athletes from Long Beach, California